Eraydın is a Turkish surname. Notable people with the surname include:

Başak Eraydın (born 1994), Turkish tennis player
Yavuz Eraydın (born 1976), Turkish footballer

Turkish-language surnames